Djeneba N'Diaye (born 8 July 1997) is a Malian basketball player for AMI Basketball and the Malian national team.

She represented Mali at the 2019 Women's Afrobasket.

References

External links

1997 births
Living people
Expatriate basketball people in Morocco
Guards (basketball)
Malian expatriate sportspeople in Morocco
Malian women's basketball players
Sportspeople from Bamako
Competitors at the 2019 African Games
African Games silver medalists for Mali
African Games medalists in basketball
21st-century Malian people